Donald Paul Kirkwood (born September 24, 1949) is an American former professional baseball pitcher who played five seasons for the California Angels, Chicago White Sox, and Toronto Blue Jays of Major League Baseball (MLB). Kirkwood attended Oakland University.

Professional career
In his first three minor league seasons, he had a win–loss record of 20–14 before making his MLB debut. His best season was 1975 with a win–loss record of 6–5 and an era of 3.11.

Personal life
In January 2020, he was inducted in the Hollie L. Lepely Hall of Honor class.
He currently works at a total sports complex, giving pitching lessons.

References

1949 births
Living people
American expatriate baseball players in Canada
Baseball players from Michigan
California Angels players
Chicago White Sox players
El Paso Diablos players
El Paso Sun Kings players
Major League Baseball pitchers
Oakland Golden Grizzlies baseball players
Quad Cities Angels players
Salinas Packers players
Sportspeople from Pontiac, Michigan
Toronto Blue Jays players